A fusion torch is a technique for utilizing the high-temperature plasma of a fusion reactor to break apart other materials (especially waste materials) and convert them into a few reusable and saleable elements. It was invented in 1968 by Bernard J. Eastlund and William C. Gough while they were program managers of the controlled thermonuclear research program of the United States Atomic Energy Commission (AEC). The basic concept was to impinge the plasma leaking from fusion reactors onto solids or liquids, vaporizing, dissociating and ionizing the materials, then separating the resulting elements into separate bins for collection. Other applications of fusion plasmas such as generation of UV and optical light, and generation of hydrogen fuel, were also described in their associated 1969 paper.

How it works

The process began with a tokamak, a doughnut-shaped magnetic "bottle", containing plasma and unwanted material. This combination would result in a pool of electrons and nuclei which in turn would cause the tokamak to overflow and transfer the plasma into an outlet. This plasma then passes through a series of metal plates, differing in particular temperatures, all arranged in descending order. The atoms of elements pass over the plates with boiling points above their own. Eventually, the atoms encounter plates where the temperature is lower than their boiling point. This makes them stick onto the plate. The plates then work as a distillation system which sorts the plasma into its constituent elements. These pure elements can then be reused.

1969 paper

In the paper "The Fusion Torch – Closing the Cycle from Use to Reuse", Bernard J. Eastlund and William C. Gough defined population (food), entropy (resources, energy, pollution), and war (human needs and behavior) as three traps that could hamper the advancement of mankind.

In terms of energy needs they estimated that by the year 2000 they would need 140,000 megawatts of electrical capacity. They also speculated that the fusion torch concept would be useful for the separation of uranium from reactor fuel element material.

Effects on the environment
Although the fusion torch will help in disposal of pollution and waste and make it available for reuse, there is also a problem that arises. The process of separating elements uses a lot of energy, and therefore creates a lot of heat. All this heat that is created from using the fusion torch will be released into the atmosphere. Such a large amount of heat could cause the surface temperature of the earth to rise. This could eventually lead to severe climate modifications and put a limit on world population and standards of living. However, the heat generated from the fusion torch and fusion can be "contained" if the system is brought to a break-even temperature, therefore, becoming self-sustaining.

References

Further reading 
"The Fusion Torch – Closing the Cycle from Use to Reuse" by Bernard J. Eastlund and William C. Gough, USAEC Report Wash 1132, May 15, 1969

Nuclear technology
1968 in science
1968 introductions